Doraemon is a Japanese manga with three anime television adaptations.

Episode list

1973 anime series
 List of Doraemon (1973 anime series) episodes

1979 anime series
 List of Doraemon (1979 anime series) episodes

2005 anime series
 List of Doraemon (2005 anime series) episodes
 List of Doraemon (2005–2009) episodes
 List of Doraemon (2010–2014) episodes
 List of Doraemon (2015–2019) episodes

External links